Jatiya Party is the name of three political parties in Bangladesh:
Jatiya Party (Ershad)
Jatiya Party (Manju)
Bangladesh Jatiya Party – BJP, previously known as the Jatiya Party (Naziur)
Jatiya Party (Zafar)